Anton Yagama (born 31 December 1954) is a Papua New Guinean politician, who, since August 2012 has served as a Member of the National Parliament of Papua New Guinea representing Usino-Bundi Open for the United Resources Party.

Life and education
Yagama completed his secondary education at St. Fidelis College in Kap, Madang Province. He completed a Bachelor of Economics at the University of Papua New Guinea. Yagama is a farmer by profession. From 1991-2011 was a member of the Church Council of the FourSquare Church.

Political career
Abel was elected to represent Usino-Bundi Open at the 2012 general election as a candidate of the United Resources Party. Yagama currently serves as the Chair of Finance Parliamentary Referral Committee.

References

Living people
Members of the National Parliament of Papua New Guinea
United Resources Party politicians
Papua New Guinean farmers
University of Papua New Guinea alumni
1954 births